Christopher Allbritton is a web blogger and journalist, best known for starting the Web log Back to Iraq during the 2003 Iraq War. After he raised $15,000 from his readers, he became the Web's "first fully reader-funded journalist-blogger."

He taught a blogging class at New York University until, after a second round of fundraising, he returned to Baghdad in May 2004 and contracted with Time magazine as a correspondent for Iraq until March 2006.

He previously worked for the Associated Press and the New York Daily News covering the Internet, technology and business. He holds a Bachelor of Arts in journalism from the University of Arkansas at Little Rock and a Masters in Science in Journalism from Columbia University Graduate School of Journalism in New York City. He then was based in Beirut, Lebanon, where he reported on the 2006 Israel-Lebanon conflict as well as a range of regional issues.

He was selected as a Knight Fellow at Stanford University, where he spent a year before moving to Pakistan and has been appointed as the Pakistan Bureau Chief for Thomson Reuters.

References

External links
Chris Allbritton, Bureau Chief, Pakistan, Islamabad, Pakistan
 Back to Iraq

Living people
Year of birth missing (living people)